Thomas J. Henderson may refer to:

Thomas James Henderson (1798–1844), first astronomer-royal of Scotland
Thomas J. Henderson (politician) (1824–1911), United States Congressman from Illinois
Thomas J. Henderson (activist) (1931–2005), American activist and construction business manager

See also
Thomas Henderson (disambiguation)